Toboggan was a steel roller coaster located at Lakemont Park in Altoona, Pennsylvania. It was a portable steel coaster built by Chance Rides, one of many Toboggan installations. This specific one had previously traveled in Florida with Deggeller Shows.

Ride experience 
The ride featured an enclosed car, which after climbing up a vertical lift inside a steel structure spun downward on a continuous helix until it went over a small airtime hill and then turned back into the station.

References

Roller coasters in Pennsylvania
Roller coasters introduced in 1991